Del Monte Kitchenomics is a Philippine television cooking show broadcast by ABS-CBN, GMA Network and GMA News TV. Sponsored by Del Monte Foods, it premiered in 1989 in ABS-CBN's morning line up. The show concluded in 2015.

Hosts 

 Rob Pengson
 Love Añover
 Luigi Muhlach
 Jolina Magdangal
 Dino Ferari
 Eugene Domingo
 Jackie Ang-Po
 Carla Abellana

References

1989 Philippine television series debuts
2015 Philippine television series endings
ABS-CBN original programming
Filipino-language television shows
Philippine cooking television series
GMA Network original programming
GMA News TV original programming